Kolenovići is a village in the municipality of Gusinje, Montenegro.

Demographics
According to the 2011 census, its population was 165.

References

Populated places in Gusinje Municipality